Rossoshka is a rural locality (a selo) in Rossoshenskoye Rural Settlement, Gorodishchensky District, Volgograd Oblast, Russia. The population was 319 as of 2010. There are 9 streets.

Geography 
Rossoshka is located in steppe, on the left bank of the Rossoshka River, 37 km west of Gorodishche (the district's administrative centre) by road. Zapadnovka is the nearest rural locality.

References 

Rural localities in Gorodishchensky District, Volgograd Oblast